Wanping Fortress, also known as Wanping Castle, is a Ming Dynasty fortress or "walled city" in Fengtai District, Beijing. It was erected in 1638–1640, with the purpose of defending Beijing against Li Zicheng and the peasant uprising.

From the beginning, it functioned as a military fortress. From west to east, it measures , and from south to the north , making it a half-square shape.

The fortress has two gates: the east gate, named Ever Prosperous Gate (永昌門, Yongchangmen), then renamed as Majestic Gate (威嚴門, Weiyanmen), and the west gate, named Favorably Govern Gate (順治門, Shunzhimen).

Wanping witnessed the incident in July 1937 that is reckoned to mark the start of the Second Sino-Japanese War, with an exchange of fire over a minor case of a Japanese soldier missing from his post. For reasons unknown, this escalated into full-scale combat. It is known as the Marco Polo Bridge Incident,  and also the Lugou Bridge Incident. 

The Museum of the War of Chinese People's Resistance Against Japanese Aggression, surrounded by a plaza and park with numerous sculptures, occupies a large portion of the space inside the fortress' walls.

To the west of the fortress are the Yongding River and the Lugou Bridge (Marco Polo Bridge, 蘆溝橋).

It will be served by Wanpingcheng station of Beijing Subway Line 16. The metro station is under construction.

Gallery

References

External links

 
 TouchBeijing.com Wanping Fortress and Lugou Bridge (Marco Polo Bridge)

Buildings and structures in Fengtai District
Tourist attractions in Beijing
17th-century establishments in China
Forts in China